Cesare Chiogna (1910 – 20 October 1978) was a Swiss ski jumper. He competed in the individual event at the 1932 Winter Olympics.

References

External links
 

1910 births
1978 deaths
Swiss male ski jumpers
Swiss male Nordic combined skiers
Olympic ski jumpers of Switzerland
Olympic Nordic combined skiers of Switzerland
Ski jumpers at the 1932 Winter Olympics
Nordic combined skiers at the 1932 Winter Olympics